Vladimir Molerović (born 14 April 1992) is a Serbian professional footballer who plays as a defensive midfielder.

Career 
On 4 December 2020, Molerović joined I-League side Chennai City. He made his debut on 9 January 2021, in a 2–1 win over Gokulam Kerala.

References

External links
 
 

1992 births
Living people
Serbian footballers
Sportspeople from Loznica
Association football midfielders
FK Drina Zvornik players
FK Šumadija Aranđelovac players
FK Sloboda Užice players
FK Podrinje Janja players
Chennai City FC players
Premier League of Bosnia and Herzegovina players
First League of the Republika Srpska players
Serbian First League players
Serbian League players
I-League players
Serbian expatriate footballers
Serbian expatriate sportspeople in Bosnia and Herzegovina
Serbian expatriate sportspeople in India
Expatriate footballers in Bosnia and Herzegovina
Expatriate footballers in India